The Pitch is an unscripted series from AMC produced by Studio Lambert that goes behind the scenes on the pressure on America's top creative ad agencies competing to pitch a new account. Each week the two agencies go head-to-head in a presentation known as The Pitch, with only seven days to prepare.

The series premiered on Monday, April 30, 2012 and was promoted with an hour-long sneak preview on April 8, 2012 preceded by a Mad Men episode. The show was given a green light in April 2011.  In June 2012 the Broadcast Television Journalists' Association nominated The Pitch for a Critics' Choice Television Award in the category of Best Reality Series - Competition.

On August 16, 2012, AMC renewed the series for a second season. The second season premiered on August 15, 2013.

Episodes

Season 1
Winner is Bolded

 Originally shown on Mondays in the United States, the series switched to Sundays in midseason.

Season 2

References

External links 

Pitch A TV Show Idea

AMC (TV channel) original programming
Television shows set in North Carolina
Television series by All3Media
2012 American television series debuts
2013 American television series endings
Television series about advertising